Platina Records (Platina Skivor) was a Swedish independent record label founded in 1964 by businessman and songwriter Evert Jakobsson. The label saw great success throughout the mid-1960s with rock acts such as Tages, before turning to dansband music in the 1970s, gaining success with Flamingokvintetten and Thorleifs. After turning to pay to play in 1984, the label shut down in 1989.

History

1960s 
During the early 1960s, Evert Jakobsson worked for Svenska Kullagerfabriken (SKF) as a computer technician. During his free time, he dreamed of becoming a teen idol, and as a result turned to music. He wrote two songs, "About Rita" and "You Sent Me A Rose", but unable to secure a recording contract, Jakobsson decided to register Platina Records as a company and almost immediately started pressing a batch of the single under the pseudonym Glenn Jackson and the Glentones. This was the first release on the record label but it failed to garner any major attention, both commercially and critically. This led to Jakobsson dropping his ambition to instead focus on running the label.

Jakobsson almost immediately focused on the blossoming Gothenburg music scene that had many popular bands that were unsigned. Tages was a band that had been the victim of extreme popularity, but hadn't been approached by any record labels. He decided to contact their manager Lars Fryklund for a meeting shortly after their victory in the Västkusens Beatles contest. Fryklund and drummer Freddie Skantze were optimistic to get signed which led to a two and a half year contract, much to the shock of Jakobsson who thought that they wouldn't sign with him. Jakobsson also produced their debut single, "Sleep Little Girl" as no other producers were present during the session. This single was both the group's and the label's breakthrough, reaching number one on Tio i Topp and three on Kvällstoppen.

The follow-up to "Sleep Little Girl", "I Should Be Glad" was also self-released by Platina. However, at the time the label wasn't assigned to any studio due to monetary restraints, which led to Jakobsson booking various studios for his label, including Metronome Records studio in Stockholm. Partly due to this, Jakobsson arranged for a deal with EMI Records, who would distribute the label's records from that point on. This deal also gave Jakobsson access to EMI's studio on Sandhamnsgatan in Stockholm which he promtply took advantage of. Jakobsson could now afford to manufacture more records which led to more and more commercial success, affording him two gold albums, Tages and Tages 2, both in 1966. Also in 1966, several singles released on the label also sold over 100.000 copies, most notably Tages "In My Dreams", which was a number one hit on both Tio i Topp and Kvällstoppen.

Tages would leave the label in January 1967, after their contract expired. The reason behind this was that Tages were offered a contract by another EMI sub-label, Parlophone Records, who could afford them more studio time and a bigger budget. Other rock bands were also signed around 1965–66, including the Pacifics, the Steelmen, Highway Gang and the Shakers. Most of these were unknown and commercially unsuccessful acts, with only the Shakers having a charting hit. After Tages, the biggest group Platina signed during the 1960s was Thor-Erics, a dansband who were signed in 1965. They had multiple entries on Svensktoppen, starting in 1966 with "Sju ensamma kvällar" which reached number five on that chart in August 1966. Flamingokvintetten were another dansband signed in 1966. They saw commercial success on Svensktoppen starting in 1967. Both bands released their debut albums in 1967, with both being produced by Jakobsson.

1970s and 80s 
By the late 1960s, the Swedish rock scene was almost completely gone, being instead replaced by progg groups or dansbands. Jakobsson decided to focus primarily on the dansband scene instead, finding it more commercially viable. Thor-Erics were still commercially successful on Svensktoppen throughout 1968–70 with songs such as "Vit som en orkidé" which reached number two on both Kvällstoppen and Svensktoppen in August 1970. Flamingokvintetten, who had two songs on Svensktoppen in 1968, one of which reached both Tio i Topp and Kvällstoppen, decided to leave the label in 1970 after forming their own record label Flam Records. Up until this point they had released four studio albums, all of which were produced by Jakobsson. Due to this, Platina released several unauthorized compilation albums of Flamingokvintetten's material throughout the 1970s, starting with 1971's Flamingos Bästa and ending with 1979's 20 Hits Med Flamingo.

By 1971 the label had signed several more dansband, including Tonix, Bert Bennys and Matz Bladhs. These all released records on the label to various degrees of commercial success. However, also in 1971, Thorleifs was signed to Platina due to the connection of manager Roddy Olofsson who was acquainted with Agnetha Fältskog. These were arguably the most commercially successful of all Platina artists, debuting on Svensktoppen with "I Mexicos land" which reached number nine. With the money earned by these releases, Jakobsson purchased a studio for the label, which he simply called Platina Studio which from 1972 onwards would be used for most of the label's releases. Thorleifs released their debut album Kommer hem till dig in 1973, which although failed to chart was a strong seller on the Swedish market. By this time the label was much more financially stable which meant that the partnership with EMI could be ended.

The label's arguably best selling albums were both by Thorleifs at the height of the dansband movement in Sweden. The first one was En dag i juni which was released in 1974. It was the first album by them to sell gold, selling an approximated 300,000 copies in Sweden and reached number two on Kvällstoppen that year. The second successful release was Gråt inga tårar, which was released the following year. This album also sold gold, and reached number one on VG-lista during that summer. However, due to contractual disagreements, Thorleifs left the label after recording Alltid tillsammans at Platina Studio, which was released under their own label Tor Records. Although the label also had success with Curt Haagers starting in 1975, the dansband craze had started waning towards the end of the decade, which contributed to Platina's decision to release the final dansband studio album in 1979, that being Canders Charlie.

By 1980, the label had ceased operation and reformed into a small pay to play label instead when operations once again started in 1984. The targeted format was 7-inch singles by smaller groups. In fact, during the label's last nine years in existence only three albums were released, these being Thorleifs 20 Godingar, Gunnar Karlsson's Våra Sköna Dansband 1  along with Tages Tages 1964–1968! The first release using this business model was Akut's "Vill ha dig" in 1984. Most of the artists releasing records on the label during this time had one thing in common was that most of them were local, obscure band who primarily played either punk rock, new wave or synth-pop. However, as many of these bands were obscure no commercial success could be garnered, and as such Platina became financially struck and Jakobsson finally decided to shut it down in 1989.  The final release on the label was "Heroes" by 3 Miles From Here in that year.

Discography

Albums 
{| class="wikitable"
!Year
!Catalogue Number
!Artist(s)
!Album title
|-
|1965
|PALP 3001
| rowspan="3" |Tages
|Tages
|-
| rowspan="2" |1966
|PALP 3002
|Tages 2
|-
|PALP 3003
|Extra Extra
|-
| rowspan="3" |1967
|PALP 3004
|Thor-Erics
|Sju Trivsamma Kvällar Med Thor-Erics
|-
|PALP 3005
|Tages
|The Best Of Tages 
|-
|PALP 3006
|Flamingokvintetten
|Harrli! Harrlå!
|-
| rowspan="3" |1968
|PALP 3007
|Tages
|Forget Him 
|-
|PALP 3008
|Flamingokvintetten
|Ja' Går Ut Med Hunden! Sticker Ut Ett Slag ...
|-
|PBLP 5002
|Tages
|The Best Of Tages 
|-
|1969
|PALP 3009
| rowspan="2" |Flamingokvintetten
|Chin Chin
|-
| rowspan="2" |1970
|PALP 3010
|Hälften Av Varje
|-
|PALP 3011
|Tonix
|Hörru, Va' E' De'?
|-
| rowspan="2" |1971
|PALP 3012
|Flamingokvintetten
|Flamingos Bästa 
|-
|PALP 3013
|Thor-Erics
|Försök Att Vara Lite Vänlig
|-
| rowspan="4" |1972
|PALP 3014
|Lill-Ingmars
|Lill-Ingmars
|-
|PALP 3015
|Matz Bladhs
|Bland Blommor Och Blad
|-
|PALP 3016
|Bert Bennys
|Du
|-
|PALP 3017
|Thor-Erics
|Vårt Strå Till Stacken
|-
| rowspan="10" |1973
|PALP 3018
|Nonnes
|Lugn I Stormen
|-
|PALP 3019
|Chiquita Brass
|Gamle Kompis
|-
|PALP 3020
|Zenits
|Fröken Vår
|-
|PALP 3021
|Thorleifs
|Kommer Hem Till Dig
|-
|PALP 3022
|Flamingokvintetten
|Flamingos Bästa 2 
|-
|PALP 3023
|Thor-Erics
|En Tidig Sönda' Morron
|-
|PALP 3024
|Macs
|Som En Sång
|-
|PALP 3025
|Drifters
|Kom Loss
|-
|PALP 3026
|Kennys
|På Festplatsen
|-
|PALP 3027
|Peter Pan
|Allt Beror På Dig
|-
| rowspan="11" |1974
|PALP 3028
|Thorleifs
|En Dag I Juni
|-
|PALP 3029
|Tonix
|Flyg Din Väg
|-
|PALP 3030
|Four Seven
|Four Seven
|-
|PALP 3032
|Flamingokvintetten
|Flamingos Bästa 3 
|-
|PALP 3033
|Lill-Ingmars
|2:an
|-
|PALP 3034
|Hobsons
|Nu E' De' Lörda' Igen
|-
|PALP 3035
|Bert Bennys
|Aja Baja Anna-Maja
|-
|PALP 3036
|Drifters
|Ikväll
|-
|PALP 3037
|Nonnes
|Nära Dej
|-
|PALP 3038
|Kennys
|Samling Vid Pumpen!
|-
|PALP 3039
|Thor-Erics
|Vi Ses Igen
|-
| rowspan="20" |1975
|PALP 3040
|Thorleifs
|Gråt Inga Tårar
|-
|PALP 3041
|Chiquita Brass
|Här Igen!
|-
|PALP 3042
|Macs
|Vår Andra
|-
|PALP 3043
|Hobsons
|Vår Mascot
|-
|PALP 3044
|Four Seven
|Hokus Pokus
|-
|PALP 3045
|Tonix
|Vindens Melodi
|-
|PALP 3046
|Bennys
|Tillsammans Igen
|-
|PALP 3047
|Curt Haagers
|Ta Mej Me'...
|-
|PALP 3048
|Flamingokvintetten
|Flamingos Bästa 4 
|-
|PALP 3049
|Milles
|Låt Mig Få Krama
|-
|PALP 3050
|Lill-Ingmars
|3:an
|-
|PALP 3050
|Nonnes
|Vi Sticker Ut...
|-
|PALP 3051
|Tonix
|Förlåt Mej Älskling
|-
|PALP 3052
|Kinells
|Flottarkärlek
|-
|PALP 3053
|Drifters
|Ett Äventyr Med Drifters
|-
|PALP 3055
|Bert Bennys
|III
|-
|PALP 3056
|Kennys
|Hänger Du Me'''
|-
|PALP 3057
|Magnus
|Dom Bästa Bitarna 1 
|-
|PALP 3058
|Four Seven
|Bugga Loss|-
|PALP 3059
|Curt Haagers
|Goa 10-I-Topp Bitar 1 
|-
| rowspan="16" |1976
|PALP 3060
|Chiquita Brass
|Gunga Me|-
|PALP 3061
|Hobsons
|Säg, Får Jag Lov!
|-
|PALP 3062
|Thor-Erics
|På Jakt Efter Dej
|-
|PALP 3063
|Milles
|Det Bästa Jag Kan Få
|-
|PALP 3064
|Peter Pan
|Anita
|-
|PALP 3065
|Magnus
|Country 1
|-
|PALP 3066
|Bennys
|Gott Humör
|-
|PALP 3067
|Kinells
|2 - Vi Möts Igen
|-
|PALP 3068
|Various Artists
|De Bästa Dansbanden 1 
|-
|PALP 3069
|Flamingokvintetten
|Flamingos Bästa 6 
|-
|PALP 3070
|Carols
|Svängiga Danslåtar 1
|-
|PALP 3071
|Bert Bennys
|IV
|-
|PALP 3072
|Various Artists
|De Bästa Dansbanden 2 
|-
|PALP 3073
|Hobsons
|Let's Twist
|-
|PALP 3074
|Peter Pan
|Goa 10 I Topp Bitar 2 
|-
|PALP 3075
|Tonix
|Tonix' Bästa 1 
|-
| rowspan="14" |1977
|PALP 3077
|Magnus
|Brustanta (Dom Bästa Bitarna 2) 
|-
|PALP 3078
|Milles
|3
|-
|PALP 3079
|Hux-Flux
|Med LP:n Hej, Hej, Hej
|-
|PALP 3080
|Kitts
|En För Alla
|-
|PALP 3081
|Rubb & Stubb
|I Våran Gamla Chevrolet
|-
|PALP 3082
|Various Artists
|De Bästa Dansbanden 3 
|-
|PALP 3083
|Bennys
|Venus
|-
|PALP 3084
|Carols
|Natten Har Sin Egen Saga
|-
|PALP 3085
|Rifflers
|Party Time
|-
|PALP 3086
|Various Artists
|De Bästa Dansbanden 4 
|-
|PALP 3087
|Magnus
|Country 2
|-
|PALP 3089
|Milles
|Knock Out!
|-
|PALP 3090
|Canders
|Försök Förstå
|-
|PALP 3091
|Thor-Erics
|Thor-Erics Bästa 
|-
| rowspan="3" |1978
|PALP 3092
|Kitts
|Alla Minnen
|-
|PALP 3093
|Kennys
|När Sommaren Kommer
|-
|PALP 3095
|Tonix
|Tonix' Bästa 2 
|-
| rowspan="4" |1979
|PALP 3097
|Canders
|Charlie
|-
|PALP 3098
|Thor-Erics
|Thor-Erics Bästa 2 
|-
|PALP 3099
|Ekelunds
|Dansglädje 1
|-
|PCLP 7501
|Flamingokvintetten
|20 Hits Med Flamingo 
|-
|1980
|PCLP 7503
|Thorleifs
|20 Godingar 
|-
|1985
|PCLP 8501
|Gunnar Karlsson
|Våra Sköna Dansband 1 
|-
| colspan="4" |Double-albums|-
|1983
|7C 138-35954
|Tages
|Tages, 1964-68!
|}

 EPs 

 References ReferencesSources'''

See also 

 Lists of record labels

Swedish record labels
Swedish independent record labels
Record labels established in 1964
Record labels disestablished in 1989
EMI
Pop record labels
Rock record labels
New wave record labels
Punk record labels
Synth-pop record labels